The following outline is provided as an overview of and topical guide to the history of painting:

History of painting – painting is the production of paintings, that is, the practice of applying paint, pigment, color or other medium to a surface (support base, such as paper, canvas, or a wall) with a brush, although other implements, such as knives, sponges, and airbrushes, can be used. The history of painting reaches back in time to artifacts and artworks created by pre-historic artists, and spans all cultures. It represents a continuous, though periodically disrupted tradition from Antiquity.

Prehistoric painting 
Pre-historic art
Cave painting
Petroglyph
Pictogram
List of Stone Age art

Ancient painting 
Art of Ancient Egypt
Knossos
Mycenaean Greece
Pottery of ancient Greece
Roman art
Pompeian Styles
Fayum mummy portraits
Early Christian art and architecture

History of western painting

Medieval painting 
Medieval art
Byzantine art
Icon
Insular art
Carolingian art
Ottonian art
Romanesque art
Gothic art
Early Netherlandish painting
Illuminated manuscript
Miniature (illuminated manuscript)
Panel painting

Painting during the Renaissance 
Early Renaissance painting
Italian Renaissance painting
Northern European Renaissance painting
Artists of the Tudor court
High Renaissance painting
Mannerism

Baroque painting 
 Baroque painting

18th-century painting 
Rococo
Neoclassicism

19th-century painting

20th-century painting

This list is in random order. Date given is for the start of the style or movement.

21st-century painting

History of eastern painting

See also

Art history 
Western painting 
History of painting
History of art
Painting
Index of painting-related articles

External links

Outlines of culture and arts
Wikipedia outlines